The history of the Jews in Europe spans a period of over two thousand years. Some Jews, a Judaean tribe from the Levant, migrated to Europe just before the rise of the Roman Empire (27 BCE). Although Alexandrian Jews had already migrated to Rome, a notable early event in the history of the Jews in the Roman Empire was the 63 BCE siege of Jerusalem.

The pre-World War II Jewish population of Europe is estimated to have been close to 9 million, or 57% of the world's Jewish population.  Around 6 million Jews were killed in the Holocaust, which was followed by the emigration of much of the surviving population.
 
The Jewish population of Europe in 2010 was estimated to be approximately 1.4 million (0.2% of the European population), or 10% of the world's Jewish population. In the 21st century, France has the largest Jewish population in Europe, followed by the United Kingdom, Germany, Russia and Ukraine.

History

Ancient period 

Hellenistic Judaism, originating from Alexandria, was present throughout the Roman Empire even before the Jewish–Roman wars. Large numbers of Jews lived in Greece (including the Greek isles in the Aegean and Crete) as early as the beginning of the 3rd century BCE. The first recorded mention of Judaism in Greece dates from 300 to 250 BCE, on the island of Rhodes. In the wake of Alexander the Great's conquests, Jews migrated from the Middle East to Greek settlements in the Eastern Mediterranean, spurred on by the opportunities they expected. As early as the middle of the 2nd century BCE, the Jewish author of the third book of the Oracula Sibyllina, addressing the "chosen people," says: "Every land is full of thee and every sea." The most diverse witnesses, such as Strabo, Philo, Seneca, Cicero, and Josephus, all mention Jewish populations in the cities of the Mediterranean Basin. Most Jewish population centers of this period were, however, still in the East (Judea and Syria) and Alexandria in Egypt was by far the most important of the Jewish communities, with the Jews in Philo's time inhabiting two of the five sections of the city. Nevertheless, a Jewish community is recorded to have existed in Rome at least since the 1st century BCE, although there may even have been an established community there as early as the second century BCE, for in the year 139 BCE, the pretor Hispanus issued a decree expelling all Jews who were not Italian citizens.

At the commencement of the reign of Caesar Augustus in 27 BCE, there were over 7,000 Jews in Rome: this is the number that escorted the envoys who came to demand the deposition of Archelaus. The Jewish historian Josephus confirms that as early as 90 CE there was already a Jewish diaspora living in Europe, made up of the two tribes, Judah and Benjamin. Thus, he writes in his Antiquities:  " …there are but two tribes in Asia Minor and Europe subject to the Romans, while the ten tribes are beyond Euphrates till now and are an immense multitude." According to E. Mary Smallwood, the appearance of Jewish settlements in southern Europe during the Roman era was probably mostly a result of migration due to commercial opportunities, writing that "no date or origin can be assigned to the numerous settlements eventually known in the west, and some may have been founded as a result of the dispersal of Judean Jews after the revolts of CE 66–70 and 132–135, but it is reasonable to conjecture that many, such as the settlement in Puteoli attested in 4 BCE, went back to the late republic or early empire and originated in voluntary emigration and the lure of trade and commerce."

Many Jews migrated to Rome from Alexandria as a result of the close trade relations between the two cities. When the Roman Empire captured Jerusalem in 63 BCE, thousands of Jewish prisoners of war were brought from Judea to Rome, where they were sold into slavery. After they gained their freedom, these Jews permanently settled in Rome on the right bank of the Tiber as traders. Following the capture of Jerusalem by the forces of Herod the Great with assistance from Roman forces in 37 BCE, it is likely that Jews were again taken to Rome as slaves. It is known that Jewish war captives were sold into slavery after the suppression of a minor Jewish revolt in 53 BCE, and some were probably taken to southern Europe.

The Roman Empire period presence of Jews in Croatia dates to the 2nd century, in Pannonia to the 3rd to 4th century. A finger ring with a menorah depiction found in Augusta Raurica (Kaiseraugst, Switzerland) in 2001 attests to Jewish presence in Germania Superior. Evidence in towns north of the Loire or in southern Gaul date to the 5th century and 6th centuries. By late antiquity, Jewish communities were found in modern-day France and Germany. In the Taman Peninsula, modern day Russia, Jewish presence dates back to the first century. Evidence of Jewish presence in Phanagoria includes tombstones with carved images of the menorah and inscriptions with references to the synagogue.

Persecution of Jews in Europe begins with the presence of Jews in regions that later became known as the lands of Latin Christendom (c. 8th century CE) and modern Europe. Not only were Jewish Christians persecuted according to the New Testament, but also as a matter of historical fact anti-Jewish pogroms occurred not only in Jerusalem (325 CE), Persia (351 CE), Carthage (250 CE), Alexandria (415), but also in Italy (224 CE), Milan (379 CE) and Menorca (418 CE), Antioch (489), Daphne-Antioch (506), Ravenna (519), amongst other places. Hostility between Christians and Jews grew over the generations under Roman sovereignty and beyond; eventually forced conversion, property confiscation, synagogue burning, expulsion, stake burning, enslavement and outlawing of Jews—even whole Jewish communities—occurred countless times in the lands of Latin Christendom.

Middle Ages

The early medieval period was a time of flourishing Jewish culture. Jewish and Christian life evolved in 'diametrically opposite directions' during the final centuries of Roman empire.  Jewish life became autonomous, decentralized, community-centered. Christian life became a hierarchical system under the supreme authority of the Pope and the Roman Emperor.

Jewish life can be characterized as democratic. Rabbis in the Talmud interpreted Deut. 29:9, "your heads, your tribes, your elders, and your officers, even all the men of Israel" and "Although I have appointed for you heads, elders, and officers, you are all equal before me" (Tanhuma) to stress political shared power.  Shared power entailed responsibilities: "you are all responsible for one another.  If there be only one righteous man among you, you will all profit from his merits, and not you alone, but the entire world...But if one of you sins, the whole generation will suffer."

Early Middle Ages

In the Early Middle Ages, persecution of Jews also continued in the lands of Latin Christendom. After the Visigoths converted from more tolerant non-trinitarian Arianism to the stricter trinitarian Nicene Christianity of Rome, in 612 CE and again in 642 CE, expulsions of all Jews were decreed in the Visigoth Empire. The Catholic Merovingian dynasty decreed forced conversion for Jews in 582 and 629 CE. Under the Roman Catholic Archdiocese of Toledo, multiple persecutions (633, 653, 693 CE) and stake burnings of Jews (638 CE) occurred; the Kingdom of Toledo followed up on this tradition in 1368, 1391, 1449, and 1486–1490 CE, including forced conversions and mass murder, and there was rioting and a blood bath against the Jews of Toledo in 1212 CE. Jewish pogroms occurred in the Diocese of Clement (France, 554 CE) and in the Diocese of Uzes (France, 561 CE).

European Jews were at first concentrated largely in southern Europe. During the High and Late Middle Ages, they migrated north. There is historical evidence of Jewish communities north of the Alps and Pyrenees in the 8th and 9th centuries. By the 11th century, Jewish settlers from southern Europe, Jewish immigrants from Babylon and Persia, and Maghrebi Jewish traders from North Africa were settling in western and central Europe, particularly in France and along the Rhine River. This Jewish migration was motivated by economic opportunities and often at the invitation of local Christian rulers, who perceived the Jews as having the know-how and capacity to jump-start the economy, improve revenue, and enlarge trade.

High Middle Ages

Persecution of Jews in Europe increased in the High Middle Ages in the context of the Christian Crusades. In the First Crusade (1096), flourishing communities on the Rhine and the Danube were utterly destroyed; see German Crusade, 1096. In the Second Crusade, (1147) the Jews in France were subject to frequent massacres. The Jews were also subjected to attacks by the Shepherds' Crusades of 1251 and 1320. The Crusades were followed by expulsions, including in 1290 the banishing of all Jews from the Kingdom of England by King Edward I with the Edict of Expulsion. In 1394, 100,000 Jews were expelled from France. Thousands more were deported from Austria in 1421. Many of the expelled Jews fled to Poland. Many Jews were also expelled from Spain after the Alhambra Decree in 1492.

In relations with Christian society, they were protected by kings, princes and bishops, because of the crucial services they provided in three areas: finance, administration, and medicine.  Christian scholars interested in the Bible would consult with Talmudic rabbis. All of this changed with the reforms and strengthening of the Roman Catholic Church and the rise of competitive middle-class, town dwelling Christians. By 1300, the friars and local priests were using the Passion Plays at Easter time, which depicted Jews, in contemporary dress, killing Christ, to teach the general populace to hate and murder Jews. It was at this point that persecution and exile became endemic. As a result of persecution, expulsions and massacres carried out by the Crusaders, Jews gradually migrated to Central and Eastern Europe, settling in Poland, Lithuania, and Russia, where they found greater security and a renewal of prosperity.

Late Middle Ages

In the Late Middle Ages, in the mid-14th century, the Black Death epidemics devastated Europe, annihilating between one-third and one-half of the population. It is an oft-told myth that due to better nutrition and greater cleanliness, Jews were not infected in similar numbers; Jews were indeed infected in numbers similar to their non-Jewish neighbors Yet they were still made scapegoats. Rumors spread that Jews caused the disease by deliberately poisoning wells. Hundreds of Jewish communities were destroyed by violence. Although Pope Clement VI tried to protect them with his 6 July 1348 papal bull and another papal bull in 1348, several months later, 900 Jews were burnt alive in Strasbourg, where the plague had not yet reached the city. Christian accusations of host desecration and blood libels were made against Jews. Pogroms followed, and the destruction of Jewish communities yielded the funds for many Pilgrimage churches or chapels throughout the Middle Ages (e.g. Saint Werner's Chapels of Bacharach, Oberwesel, Womrath; Deggendorfer Gnad in Bavaria).

Jewish survival in the face of external pressures from the Roman Catholic empire and the Persian Zoroastrian empire is seen as 'enigmatic' by historians.

Salo Wittmayer Baron credits Jewish survival to eight factors:
Messianic faith:  Belief in an ultimately positive outcome and restoration to them of the Land of Israel.
The doctrine of the World-to-Come increasingly elaborated:  Jews were reconciled to suffering in this world, which helped them resist outside temptations to convert.
Suffering was given meaning through hope-inducing interpretation of their history and their destiny.
The doctrine of martyrdom and inescapability of persecution transformed it into a source of communal solidarity.
Jewish daily life was very satisfying.  Jews lived among Jews.  In practice, in a lifetime, individuals encountered overt persecution only on a few dramatic occasions.  Jews mostly lived under discrimination that affected everyone, and to which they were habituated.  Daily life was governed by a multiplicity of ritual requirements, so that each Jew was constantly aware of God throughout the day.  "For the most part, he found this all-encompassing Jewish way of life so eminently satisfactory that he was prepared to sacrifice himself...for the preservation of its fundamentals." Those commandments for which Jews had sacrificed their lives, such as defying idolatry, not eating pork, observing circumcision, were the ones most strictly adhered to.
The corporate development and segregationist policies of the late Roman empire and Persian empire, helped keep Jewish community organization strong.
Talmud provided an extremely effective force to sustain Jewish ethics, law and culture, judicial and social welfare system, universal education, regulation of strong family life and religious life from birth to death.
The concentration of Jewish masses within 'the lower middle class', with the middle class virtues of sexual self-control.  There was a moderate path between asceticism and licentiousness.  Marriage was considered to be the foundation of ethnic, and ethical, life.

Outside hostility only helped cement Jewish unity and internal strength and commitment.

Golden age of Jewish culture in Spain

The Golden age of Jewish culture in Spain refers to a period of history during the Muslim rule of Iberia in which Jews were generally accepted in society and Jewish religious, cultural and economic life blossomed. This "Golden Age" is variously dated from the 8th to 12th centuries.

Al-Andalus was a key center of Jewish life during the Middle Ages, producing important scholars and one of the most stable and wealthy Jewish communities. A number of famous Jewish philosophers and scholars flourished during this time, most notably Maimonides.

Spanish Inquisition

The Spanish Inquisition was established in 1478 by Catholic Monarchs Ferdinand and Isabella to maintain Catholic orthodoxy in their kingdoms and was under the direct control of the Spanish monarchy. It was not definitively abolished until 1834, during the reign of Isabel II.

The Inquisition, as an ecclesiastical tribunal, had jurisdiction only over baptized Christians. However, since Jews (in 1492) and Muslim Moors (in 1502) had been banished from Spain, jurisdiction of the Inquisition during a large part of its history extended in practice to all royal subjects. The Inquisition worked in large part to ensure the orthodoxy of recent converts known as conversos or marranos.

Poland as the center of the Jewish community

The expulsion of the Jews from Spain in 1492, as well as expulsion from Austria, Hungary and Germany, stimulated a widespread Jewish migration to the much more tolerant Poland. Indeed, with the expulsion of the Jews from Spain, Poland became the recognized haven for exiles from the rest of Europe; and the resulting accession to the ranks of Polish Jewry made it the cultural and spiritual center of the Jewish people in Europe.

The most prosperous period for Polish Jews began following this new influx of Jews with the reign of Sigismund I the Old (r. 1506–1548), who protected the Jews in his realm. His son, Sigismund II Augustus (r. 1548–1572), mainly followed the tolerant policy of his father and also granted autonomy to the Jews in the matter of communal administration, laying the foundation for the power of the Qahal, or autonomous Jewish community. This period led to the creation of a proverb about Poland being a "heaven for the Jews". According to some sources, about three-quarters of all the Jews in Europe lived in Poland by the middle of the 16th century. In the middle of the 16th century, Poland welcomed Jewish newcomers from Italy and Turkey, mostly of Sephardi origin; while some of the immigrants from the Ottoman Empire claimed to be Mizrahim. Jewish religious life thrived in many Polish communities. In 1503, the Polish monarchy appointed Rabbi Jacob Polak, the official Rabbi of Poland, marking the emergence of the Chief Rabbinate. Around 1550, many Sephardi Jews travelled across Europe to find a haven in Poland. Therefore, the Polish Jews are said to be of many ethnic origins including Ashkenazic, Sephardic, and Mizrahi. During the 16th and 17th century Poland had the largest Jewish population in the whole of  Europe.

By 1551, Polish Jews were given permission to choose their own Chief Rabbi. The Chief Rabbinate held power over law and finance, appointing judges and other officials. Other powers were shared with local councils. The Polish government permitted the Rabbinate to grow in power and used it for tax collection purposes. Only 30% of the money raised by the Rabbinate went to the Jewish communities. The rest went to the Crown for protection. In this period Poland-Lithuania became the main center for Ashkenazi Jewry, and its yeshivot achieved fame from the early 16th century.

Moses Isserles (1520–1572), an eminent Talmudist of the 16th century, established his yeshiva in Kraków. In addition to being a renowned Talmudic and legal scholar, Isserles was also learned in Kabbalah, and studied history, astronomy, and philosophy.

The development of Judaism in Poland and the Commonwealth

The culture and intellectual output of the Jewish community in Poland had a profound impact on Judaism as a whole. Some Jewish historians have recounted that the word Poland is pronounced as Polania or Polin in Hebrew, and as transliterated into Hebrew. These names for Poland were interpreted as "good omens" because Polania can be broken down into three Hebrew words: po ("here"), lan ("dwells"), ya ("God"), and Polin into two words of: po ("here") lin ("[you should] dwell"). The "message" was that Poland was meant to be a good place for the Jews. During the time from the rule of Sigismund I the Old until the Holocaust, Poland would be at the center of Jewish religious life.

Yeshivot were established, under the direction of the rabbis, in the more prominent communities. Such schools were officially known as gymnasiums, and their rabbi principals as rectors. Important yeshivot existed in Kraków, Poznań, and other cities. Jewish printing establishments came into existence in the first quarter of the 16th century. In 1530, a Hebrew Pentateuch (Torah) was printed in Kraków; and at the end of the 16th century the Jewish printing houses of that city and Lublin issued a large number of Jewish books, mainly of a religious character. The growth of Talmudic scholarship in Poland was coincident with the greater prosperity of the Polish Jews; and because of their communal autonomy educational development was wholly one-sided and along Talmudic lines. Exceptions are recorded, however, where Jewish youth sought secular instruction in the European universities. The learned rabbis became not merely expounders of the Law, but also spiritual advisers, teachers, judges, and legislators; and their authority compelled the communal leaders to make themselves familiar with the abstruse questions of Jewish law. Polish Jewry found its views of life shaped by the spirit of Talmudic and rabbinical literature, whose influence was felt in the home, in school, and in the synagogue.

In the first half of the 16th century the seeds of Talmudic learning had been transplanted to Poland from Bohemia, particularly from the school of Jacob Pollak, the creator of Pilpul ("sharp reasoning"). Shalom Shachna (c. 1500 – 1558), a pupil of Pollak, is counted among the pioneers of Talmudic learning in Poland. He lived and died in Lublin, where he was the head of the yeshivah which produced the rabbinical celebrities of the following century. Shachna's son Israel became rabbi of Lublin on the death of his father, and Shachna's pupil Moses Isserles (known as the ReMA) (1520–1572) achieved an international reputation among the Jews as the author of the Mappah, which adapted the Shulkhan Arukh to meet the needs of the Ashkenazi community.  His contemporary and correspondent Solomon Luria (1510–1573) of Lublin also enjoyed widespread popularity among his co-religionists; and the authority of both was recognized by the Jews throughout Europe. Heated religious disputations were common, and Jewish scholars participated in them. At the same time, the Kabbalah had become entrenched under the protection of Rabbinism; and such scholars as Mordecai Jaffe and Yoel Sirkis devoted themselves to its study. This period of great Rabbinical scholarship was interrupted by the Khmelnytsky Uprising and the Swedish Deluge.

The rise of Hasidism

The decade from the Cossacks' uprising until after the Swedish war (1648–1658) left a deep and lasting impression not only on the social life of the Polish-Lithuanian Jews, but on their spiritual life as well. The intellectual output of the Jews of Poland was reduced. The Talmudic learning which up to that period had been the common possession of the majority of the people became accessible to a limited number of students only. What religious study there was became overly formalized, some rabbis busied themselves with quibbles concerning religious laws; others wrote commentaries on different parts of the Talmud in which hair-splitting arguments were raised and discussed; and at times these arguments dealt with matters which were of no practical importance. At the same time, many miracle workers made their appearance among the Jews of Poland, culminating in a series of false "Messianic" movements, most famously Sabbateanism and Frankism.

Into this time of mysticism and overly formal rabbinism came the teachings of Israel ben Eliezer, known as the Baal Shem Tov, or BeShT, (1698–1760), which had a profound effect on the Jews of Central Europe and Poland in particular. His disciples taught and encouraged a new fervent brand of Judaism based on Kabbalah known as Hasidism. The rise of Hasidic Judaism within Poland's borders and beyond had a great influence on the rise of Haredi Judaism all over the world, with a continuous influence through its many Hasidic dynasties including those of Chabad-Lubavitch, Aleksander, Bobov, Ger, and Nadvorna. More recent rebbes of Polish origin include Rabbi Yosef Yitzchok Schneersohn (1880–1950), the sixth head of the Chabad Lubavitch Hasidic movement, who lived in Warsaw until 1940 when he moved Lubavitch from Warsaw to the United States.

19th century

In the Papal States, which existed until 1870, Jews were required to live only in specified neighborhoods called ghettos.  Until the 1840s, they were required to regularly attend sermons urging their conversion to Christianity.  Only Jews were taxed to support state boarding schools for Jewish converts to Christianity.  It was illegal to convert from Christianity to Judaism.  Sometimes Jews were baptized involuntarily, and, even when such baptisms were illegal, forced to practice the Christian religion.  In many such cases the state separated them from their families.  See Edgardo Mortara for an account of one of the most widely publicized instances of acrimony between Catholics and Jews in the Papal States in the second half of the 19th century.

The movement of Zionism originates in the late 19th century.
In 1883, Nathan Birnbaum founded Kadimah, the first Jewish student association in Vienna. In 1884, the first issue of Selbstemanzipation (Self Emancipation) appeared, printed by Birnbaum himself.
The Dreyfus Affair, which erupted in France in 1894, profoundly shocked emancipated Jews. The depth of antisemitism in a country thought of as the home of enlightenment and liberty led many to question their future security in Europe. Among those who witnessed the Affair was an Austro-Hungarian (born in Budapest, lived in Vienna) Jewish journalist, Theodor Herzl, who published his pamphlet Der Judenstaat ("The Jewish State") in 1896 and Altneuland ("The Old New Land") in 1897. He described the Affair as a personal turning point, Before the Affair, Herzl had been anti-Zionist; afterwards he became ardently pro-Zionist. In line with the ideas of 19th-century German nationalism Herzl believed in a Jewish state for the Jewish nation. In that way, he argued, the Jews could become a people like all other peoples, and antisemitism would cease to exist.

Herzl infused political Zionism with a new and practical urgency. He brought the World Zionist Organization into being and, together with Nathan Birnbaum, planned its First Congress at Basel in 1897.
For the first four years, the World Zionist Organization (WZO) met every year, then, up to the Second World War, they gathered every second year. Since the war, the Congress has met every four years.

History of the Jews in Hungary

In what is now known as Hungary, there were Jewish communities even before the Hungarian Conquest of 895. They settled down in around 200–300 CE, when those who were to be the founders of the Jewish community emigrated to the territory that would become modern-day Hungary. They were merchants from the Roman Empire and slaves from what is now Israel.

Saint Stephen, Hungary's first Christian king, despite his efforts to spread his religion, practiced fairly liberal politics and ensured equal legal rights to people of all religions, including the Jews. During the reign of Stephen I., Jews were able to move to the developing towns, and so the "historical religious communities" evolved, these were Buda, Esztergom, Tata and Óbuda. The medieval Jewry's heyday occurred with the zenith of the country's political and economical development, during the reign of King Matthias. However, after the death of Matthias in 1490 and as a result of the approaching Turkish threat – antisemitism reared its head. In the middle of the 17th century however, Buda, being home to famous scholars, rabbis, kabbalists, writers, and poets speaking the Hebrew language, developed into the most important European Jewish community of the time. After Buda's recapture in 1686, Jews arrived to the country's deserted western and eastern border-land along with German and Slovak settlers from Czech-Moravia, later from Poland, and Galicia, which had fallen under the control of the Monarchy. In 1769 20,000, in 1787 80,000 people belonged to the Jewish population of Hungary. Members of the community made their living in agricultural and wine trade.

In the early 19th century, in the reform age the progressive nobility set many goals of innovation, like the emancipation of the Hungarian Jewry. Hungarian Jews were able to play a part in the economy by assuming an important role in industrial and trading development. For example, Izsák Lőwy (1793–1847) founded his leather factory on a previously purchased piece of land in 1835, and created a new, modern town, with independent authority, religious equality and industrial freedom independent from the guilds. The town, which was given the name Újpest (New Pest), soon became a very important settlement. Its first synagogue was built in 1839. (Újpest, the current capital's 4th district is in the northern part of Budapest. During the time of the Holocaust 20,000 Jews were deported from here.) Mór Fischer Farkasházi (1800–1880) founded his world-famous porcelain factory in Herend in 1839, its artistic porcelains decorated, among others, Queen Victoria's table.

Religious organizations
In 1868/69 three major Jewish organizations were founded: the largest group were the more modern congressional or neolog Jews, the very traditional minded joined the orthodox movement, and the conservatives formed the status quo organization. The neolog Grand Synagogue had been built earlier, in 1859, in the Dohány Street. The main status quo temple, the nearby Rumbach Street Synagogue was constructed in 1872. The Budapest orthodox synagogue is located on Kazinczy Street, along with the orthodox community's headquarters and mikveh.

In May 1923, in the presence of President Michael Hainisch, the First World Congress of Jewish Women was inaugurated at the Hofburg in Vienna, Austria.

World War II and the Holocaust

The Holocaust of the Jewish people (from the Greek ὁλόκαυστον (holókauston): holos, "completely" and kaustos, "burnt"), also known as Ha-Shoah, or Churben, as described in June 2013 at Auschwitz by Avner Shalev (Director of Yad Vashem) is the term generally used to describe the murder of approximately 6,000,000 Jews during World War II, as part of a program of deliberate attempt to annihilate the Jewish people, executed by the Nazi regime in Nazi Germany led by Adolf Hitler and its accomplices; the result of the Shoah or the Holocaust of the Jewish people was the destruction of hundreds of Jewish communities in continental Europe—two out of three Jews of Europe were murdered.

Demographics
The Jewish population of Europe in 2010 was estimated to be approximately 1.4 million (0.2% of the European population) or 10% of the world's Jewish population. In the 21st century, France has the largest Jewish population in Europe, followed by the United Kingdom, Germany, Russia and Ukraine.

Jewish ethnic subdivisions of Europe

 Armenian Jews
 Ashkenazim (Yiddish speaking Jews)
 Crimean Karaites and Krymchaks (Crimean Jews)
 Georgian Jews
 Italian Jews (also known as Bnei Roma)
 Mizrahi Jews
 Romaniotes (Greek Jews)
 Sephardim (Spanish/Portuguese Jews)
 Turkish Jews

See also
History of Europe
Jewish history
The YIVO Encyclopedia of Jews in Eastern Europe

Notes

Further reading

 
Expulsions of Jews
Jews and Judaism in Europe
Middle Eastern diaspora in Europe